Ashley Robertson is a Canadian country music singer. She won the European Country Music Association Female Vocalist of the Year award two times.

Discography
 Start Again
"Woman in the White Dress" on 2012 Compliance (film) soundtrack

References

Living people
Year of birth missing (living people)
Musicians from Winnipeg
Canadian women country singers